The discography of Lower Than Atlantis, an English rock band, consists of five studio albums, one compilation album, four EPs and 13 singles.

Studio albums

Compilation albums

Extended plays

Singles

Original compilation appearances

Videography

See also
 List of songs recorded by Lower Than Atlantis

References
 Footnotes

 Citations

Discographies of British artists
Alternative rock discographies
Post-hardcore group discographies